Lopes is a surname of Portuguese origin.

Lopes may also refer to:

 LOPES (telescope), a cosmic ray detector array in Germany
 LOPES (exoskeleton), a gait rehabilitation robot for treadmill training
 Astolpho Junio Lopes (born 1983), or simply Lopes, a Brazilian footballer